New Egypt is an unincorporated community and census-designated place (CDP) located within Plumsted Township, in Ocean County, New Jersey, United States. As of the 2010 United States Census, the CDP's population was 2,512.

History
Originally given the name Egypt in 1793 and New Egypt in 1801, the name is believed to be a biblical allusion about "going to Egypt for corn" that was plentiful in the area.

Geography
According to the United States Census Bureau, the CDP had a total area of 4.071 square miles (10.543 km2), including 4.015 square miles (10.398 km2) is land and 0.056 square mile (0.145 km2) of water (1.38%).

Community
The community has a volunteer fire station, a first aid station, and a police department. New Egypt has a supermarket and several other small stores downtown. It is also home to seven churches: Assumption Roman Catholic Church, Bible Baptist Church, Church of Christ, Church of the Nazarene, New Egypt United Methodist Church, Plumsted Presbyterian Church, and The Christian Fellowship Church of New Egypt. Oakford Lake is located in the middle of the town. In the early 1900s the location thrived as a tourist and vacation attraction.

New Egypt also has a recreation field which includes four baseball fields, a football field, two softball fields, and a basketball court and three small fields used for tee ball.

McGuire Air Force Base is immediately south of New Egypt.

Demographics

Census 2010

Census 2000
As of the 2000 United States Census there were 2,519 people, 913 households, and 664 families residing in New Egypt. The population density was 241.9/km2 (625.9/mi2). There were 980 housing units at an average density of 94.1/km2 (243.5/mi2). The racial makeup of New Egypt was 91.90% White, 2.18% African American, 0.28% Native American, 1.27% Asian, 2.74% from other races, and 1.63% from two or more races. Hispanic or Latino of any race were 6.19% of the population.

There were 913 households, out of which 38.2% had children under the age of 18 living with them, 56.6% were married couples living together, 11.8% had a female householder with no husband present, and 27.2% were non-families. 21.1% of all households were made up of individuals, and 6.0% had someone living alone who was 65 years of age or older. The average household size was 2.76 and the average family size was 3.18.

In New Egypt the population was spread out, with 28.1% under the age of 18, 8.9% from 18 to 24, 33.4% from 25 to 44, 21.2% from 45 to 64, and 8.3% who were 65 years of age or older. The median age was 36 years. For every 100 females, there were 99.8 males. For every 100 females age 18 and over, there were 99.1 males.

The median income for a household in New Egypt was $49,297, and the median income for a family was $50,833. Males had a median income of $38,156 versus $35,313 for females. The per capita income for New Egypt was $18,771. About 5.9% of families and 7.6% of the population were below the poverty line, including 7.8% of those under age 18 and 3.9% of those age 65 or over.

Transportation
NJ Transit provides bus service to Philadelphia on the 317 bus route. New Egypt was a major stop on the Pennsylvania Railroad's Pemberton & Hightstown line; it was abandoned in 1979. The former roadbed was converted in 2010 for rail trail use as the Union Transportation Trail.

Wineries
 Laurita Winery

Notable people

People who were born in, residents of, or otherwise closely associated with New Egypt include
 Deena Nicole Cortese (born 1987), cast member of MTV's Jersey Shore.
 Keith Jones, news anchor and reporter for WCAU in Philadelphia.
 Duke Lacroix (born 1993), professional soccer player who plays as a forward for Indy Eleven in the North American Soccer League.
 Rocky Marval (born 1965), pairs figure skater who finished 10th at the 1992 Winter Olympics together with partner Calla Urbanski.
 Stephen Panasuk (born 1989), quarterback for the Cleveland Gladiators of the Arena Football League.

References

External links

Plumsted Township
New Egypt Football, Dance & Cheer
New Egypt Fire Company Station 39

Census-designated places in Ocean County, New Jersey
Plumsted Township, New Jersey